Abram and Sallie Printz Farm, also known as Mountain View Farm, is a historic home and farm located near Luray, Page County, Virginia, United States. The farmhouse was built about 1872, and is a two-story, frame dwelling with vernacular Greek Revival and Victorian interior design elements. A two-story rear ell was added about 1900. Also on the property are the contributing washhouse, meat house, garage, bank barn, corn crib and wagon shelter, and the foundations of three buildings.

It was listed on the National Register of Historic Places in 1999.

References

Houses on the National Register of Historic Places in Virginia
Farms on the National Register of Historic Places in Virginia
Greek Revival houses in Virginia
Victorian architecture in Virginia
Houses completed in 1872
Houses in Page County, Virginia
National Register of Historic Places in Page County, Virginia